Chain Bridge Bank, National Association (N.A.) is a nationally chartered bank organized under the laws of the United States. The bank is headquartered in McLean, Virginia, and serves trade associations, think tanks, lobbying firms, political committees, nonprofit organizations, businesses, and individuals across the country.

Bloomberg Businessweek once called Chain Bridge Bank "The Most Important Bank in America." The bank has only one location in McLean, 10 miles west of Washington, D.C.

In 2011, Chain Bridge was "fast becoming the preferred bank of the Republican Party." In 2015, Bloomberg Businessweek headlined a story "Where Candidates Stash Their Cash" describing the bank's dominance in banking Republican presidential campaigns and allied committees leading up to the 2016 United States elections.

The Trump Victory Committee is among the many political entities, mostly but not entirely Republican, that have held accounts at Chain Bridge. The Richmond Times-Dispatch noted that Chain Bridge is uniquely dependent on its political business: "its deposits tend to swell in election years and dissipate as soon as ballots are cast." The bank maintains higher than average asset quality and liquidity.

History
Chain Bridge was founded, de novo, in 2007 by Peter Fitzgerald, two years after the Illinois Republican was succeeded as junior senator from Illinois by Barack Obama. The bank was opened with capital in part from "family wealth."

Fitzgerald is the son of Gerald F. Fitzgerald, who was chairman of Chicago's Suburban Bancorp, which was sold to Bank of Montreal in 1994 for $246 million. Gerald had a policy of lending out no more than half his banks' deposits (according to the FDIC, the national average for banks is 81%). "My father couldn't sleep at night if he did not have 50% liquid assets at any one time," Peter told Chicago Business after Gerald's death in 2010. The extended Fitzgerald family has owned, co-owned, or managed around 57 commercial banks since the 1940s.

Shortly after opening, Chain Bridge Bank cancelled a bricks and mortar branching strategy and instead concentrated on implementing emerging technologies, such as remote deposit capture, in order to bank clients all across the country.

Chain Bridge began attracting large-scale political, non-profit, and commercial deposits during the financial crisis of 2008 because it had no bad assets and did not rely on borrowing to fund its operations. "We're drowning in liquidity because people are pulling money out from other places and depositing it with us," Peter Fitzgerald told the Washington Post in September 2008. Presidential candidate John McCain, Fitzgerald's former colleague in the Senate, moved campaign funds to Chain Bridge in 2008.

The bank invests most of its deposits in reserves at the Fed or other liquid assets. "Knowing that campaigns might need to take money out at any time, we more or less have to keep the deposits in cash," according to Fitzgerald.

The bank opened a mortgage division in 2012 that does customized lending and focuses on jumbo loans.

Chain Bridge banked the 2012 presidential campaign of Mitt Romney. Many super-PACs have also had accounts at Chain Bridge. The bank specializes in treasury management, speedy deposit account opening, credit card issuance, and client support for trade associations, political campaigns, and other large enterprises.

Services and policies are tailored to the needs of political campaigns, based on Fitzgerald's personal knowledge of those needs from his own experience in politics. The bank keeps its wire service open until 5 p.m., more than two hours later than most banks. All bankers are required to keep their cell phone numbers on their business cards.

"We are 24/7," Fitzgerald told the Financial Times in 2012. "We're a very high-touch bank, as opposed to the mass retail banks, which I think the political people need and desire. They call weekends and nights – they need to wire things out. If someone calls us at 4:45, we can still do that wire. If you call a mass retail bank, they will probably tell you their wire room closed at 2:30."

Election lawyers have credited Chain Bridge with familiarity with Federal Election Committee regulations. In 2021, Chain Bridge continued to "specialize[] in discreetly transferring campaign money."

Leadership
 Peter G. Fitzgerald, chairman of Chain Bridge Bank, N.A. and Chain Bridge Bancorp, Inc.
 John J. Brough, chief executive officer and director of Chain Bridge Bank, N.A. and Chain Bridge Bancorp, Inc.
 David M. Evinger, president – risk management and director of Chain Bridge Bank, N.A. and Chain Bridge Bancorp, Inc.
 Joanna Williamson, chief financial officer, Chain Bridge Bank, N.A. and treasurer, Chain Bridge Bancorp, Inc.

Board
The Chain Bridge Bank board of directors includes Philip Odeen, a defense industry executive who has held senior positions in government; Michelle Korsmo, former executive vice president of the Americans for Prosperity Foundation; and Jonathan Missner, former national affairs managing director of AIPAC. Relations of Senator Fitzgerald, Thomas Fitzgerald and Andrew Fitzgerald, are also on the board.

Clients
In addition to campaigns and committees associated with McCain, Romney, and Trump, Chain Bridge clients have included several lobbying firms, the Susan B. Anthony List, the American Conservative Union (host of CPAC), American Crossroads, and Votesane PAC. Other political clients have included the presidential campaign of Rick Perry and political action committees led by John Boehner and Sarah Palin, as well as the PAC of the Blue Dog Coalition.

2016 Republican presidential primary candidates who banked with Chain Bridge include Jeb Bush, Rand Paul, and super-PACs representing Ben Carson, Carly Fiorina, Scott Walker, Bobby Jindal, and Lindsey Graham. The Republican National Committee and many state GOP parties have also been clients.

As of January 2021, the following Republican senators, all of whom voted on January 6 to reject the results of the 2020 presidential election, maintained relationships with Chain Bridge: Roger Marshall of Kansas, Rick Scott, and Tommy Tuberville.

The Hawaii GOP told the FEC in February 2021 that it had a previously undisclosed bank account at Chain Bridge.

One Chain Bridge client, the Trump Victory Committee, was being investigated for campaign finance reporting discrepancies as of April 2021. The Trump Victory Committee made disbursements to state GOP committees, who in turn passed identical disbursements on to the RNC. This may have been an attempt to evade regulations limiting contributions that the RNC can receive.

References

External links
 

Companies based in McLean, Virginia
Banks based in Virginia
Banks established in 2007
2007 establishments in Virginia